Castelnaudia is a genus of beetles in the family Carabidae, containing the following species:

 Castelnaudia cordata (Chaudoir, 1865)
 Castelnaudia cyanea (Castelnau, 1840)
 Castelnaudia cyaneotincta (Boisduval, 1835)
 Castelnaudia eungella (Darlington, 1962)
 Castelnaudia hecate (Tschitscherine, 1901)
 Castelnaudia kirrama (Darlington, 1962)
 Castelnaudia marginifera (Chaudoir, 1865)
 Castelnaudia mixta (Darlington, 1962)
 Castelnaudia obscuripennis (Macleay, 1887)
 Castelnaudia porphyriaca (Sloane, 1900)
 Castelnaudia queenslandica (Csiki, 1930)
 Castelnaudia septemcostata Chaudoir, 1874
 Castelnaudia setosiceps (Sloane, 1923)
 Castelnaudia spec (Darlington, 1962)
 Castelnaudia speciosa Sloane, 1911
 Castelnaudia superba (Castelnau, 1867)
 Castelnaudia wilsoni (Castelnau, 1867)

References

Pterostichinae